Hemmatabad-e Sofla (also Romanized as Hemmatābād-e Soflá; also known as Hemmatābād, Hemmatābād-e Pā‘īn, and Himmatābād) is a village in Takab Rural District, Shahdad District, Kerman County, Kerman Province, Iran. At the 2006 census, its population was 247, in 57 families.

References 

Populated places in Kerman County